A cloak is a type of loose garment that is worn over indoor clothing.

Cloak may also refer to:

 Cloak of invisibility, in fiction
 Cloak and Dagger (comics), Marvel Comics character
 Cloak, a Star Trek: Section 31 novel
 Cloak and cloaking, IRC terms related to hostmasks
 Cloaking, a search engine optimization technique
 Cloaking device, a previously science-fiction, stealth system
 A chameleon in the 2006 Disney animated film The Wild
Ketonet, a biblical garment used by Israelite priests